Lenny Pickett (born April 10, 1954) is an American saxophonist and musical director of the Saturday Night Live band. From 1973 to 1981 he was a member of Tower of Power.

He is known for his skill in the altissimo register (executed by using a combination of voicing control, air stream control, and alternate fingerings), which can be heard during the opening credits of Saturday Night Live.

Music career
Pickett grew up in Berkeley, California. He has no formal musical training, did not attend high school beyond the first year and did not attend college. After dropping out of high school, he took lessons from Bert Wilson, a jazz saxophonist known for his facility with the altissimo register. Other than those lessons, he is self-taught on saxophone.

In the 1970s and early 1980s, he led the horn section for Tower of Power, an innovative and funk-focused East San Francisco Bay area band, and also a popular session band that backed many musicians in multiple genres, from Elton John to musicians in soul music, rhythm and blues, and funk. Tower of Power also released its own albums as a group.

Pickett joined the Saturday Night Live Band in 1985 and has served as the band's musical director since G. E. Smith left in 1995.

As a composer, he has written for his group, the Borneo Horns, and has received a number of commissions to write works mixing classical and popular idioms for a variety of musical ensembles, including the New Century Saxophone Quartet, as well as music for theatre and collaborations with dancers, poets and film-makers. He is a professor of jazz saxophone at New York University.

Discography
As leader
 Lenny Pickett with the Borneo Horns
 Bad Dreams Lenny Pickett
 The Prescription (feat. UMO Jazz Orchestra)
 Heard by Others Lenny Pickett & John Hadfield

Other appearances
 "Weekend in the Dust", Love This Giant,  David Byrne and St. Vincent
 "Hot Fun in the Summertime", The Liberty Concert (1985), Hall & Oates

1970s

 1972 Why Don't You Try Me? – Earth Quake
 1973 Tower of Power – Tower of Power
 1973 Betty Davis – Betty Davis
 1974 Back to Oakland – Tower of Power
 1974 Caribou – Elton John
 1974 In the Beginning – Roy Buchanan
 1974 Link Wray Rumble – Link Wray
 1974 Monkey Grip – Bill Wyman
 1974 Ron Gardner – Ron Gardner
 1974 Free Beer and Chicken – John Lee Hooker
 1974 For My Love...Mother Music – José Feliciano
 1974 Release Yourself – Graham Central Station
 1974 Insane Asylum – Kathi McDonald
 1974 Monsieur – Hiroshi Kamayatsu
 1974 Jezebel – Mary McCreary
 1974 Feats Don't Fail Me Now – Little Feat
 1975 Urban Renewal – Tower of Power
 1975 In the Slot – Tower of Power
 1975 Not a Little Girl Anymore – Linda Lewis
 1975 Rescue Me – Roy Buchanan
 1975 Secret Sauce – Skyking
 1975 Tales from the Ozone – Commander Cody
 1975 Change – Spanky and Our Gang
 1975 Rufus featuring Chaka Khan – Rufus
 1975 Ain't No 'Bout-A-Doubt It – Graham Central Station
 1975 Rise Sleeping Beauty – Lenny Williams
 1976 Ain't Nothin' Stoppin' Us Now – Tower of Power
 1976 Chameleon – Labelle
 1976 Live and in Living Color – Tower of Power
 1976 Mirror – Graham Central Station
 1976 Nine on a Ten Scale – Sammy Hagar
 1976 Stone Alone – Bill Wyman
 1976 Tom Thumb – Michael Dinner
 1976 A Night on the Town – Rod Stewart
 1976 Impact – Impact
 1976 Affectionate – R.C. Succession
 1976 Hard Candy – Ned Doheny
 1976 Hometown Boy Makes Good – Elvin Bishop
 1976 In Touch – Tommy James
 1976 The Keane Brothers – Keane Brothers
 1976 The Lost Heritage Tapes – John Kay
 1976 Act Like Nothing's Wrong – Al Kooper
 1976 Gavin Christopher – Gavin Christopher
 1976 White Bird – David LaFlamme
 1976 Jaye P. Morgan – Jaye P. Morgan
 1976 Billy Preston – Billy Preston
 1977 Supersonic Lover – Brian & Brenda Russell
 1977 Big City – Lenny White
 1977 Choosing You – Lenny Williams
 1977 Funk in a Mason Jar – Harvey Mason
 1977 New Directions – The Meters
 1977 Nielsen/Pearson – Nielsen/Pearson
 1977 Right on Time – The Brothers Johnson
 1977 Time Loves a Hero – Little Feat
 1977 Marin County Line – New Riders of the Purple Sage
 1977 Red – Sammy Hagar
 1977 An Insatiable High – Masayoshi Takanaka
 1977 Good News – Attitudes
 1977 Disco Fantasy – Coke Escovedo
 1977 Feel the Fire – Jermaine Jackson
 1977 God Only Knows (45 RPM) – Marilyn Scott
 1977 Right On Time – The Brothers Johnson
 1977 The Tim Weisberg Band – Tim Weisberg Band
 1977 Sierra – Sierra
 1977 Patrick Gleeson's Star Wars – Patrick Gleeson
 1978 Frontiers – Jermaine Jackson
 1978 In Tails – King Biscuit Flower Hour – Journey
 1978 Before the Rain – Lee Oskar
 1978 Desert Horizon – Norton Buffalo
 1978 Dinner with Raoul – Bliss Band
 1978 Jesse Barish – Jesse Barish
 1978 Crimson Tide – Crimson Tide
 1978 Tattoo Man – Denise McCann
 1978 Sgt. Pepper's Lonely Hearts Club Band soundtrack
 1978 Waiting for Columbus – Little Feat
 1978 We Came to Play! – Tower of Power
 1978 What Have You Done for Love – Hodges, James & Smith
 1978 Jet Lag – Nick Chavin
 1978 Never Even Thought – Colin Blunstone
 1978 Winner – Renée Geyer
 1979 Back on the Streets – Tower of Power
 1979 Everything You've Heard Is True – Tom Johnston
 1979 Live & Learn – Elkie Brooks
 1979 Richard Evans – Richard Evans
 1979 Silent Letter – America
 1979 Victim of Love – Elton John
 1979 You're So Good – Helen Reddy
 1979 Muscle Shoals '79 (2008) – James Walsh Gypsy Band
 1979 Magic Lady – Sergio Mendes
 1979 Gonna Getcha' Love – Charles Jackson
 1979 Melissa Manchester – Melissa Manchester
 1979 8 for the 80's – Webster Lewis
 1979 Play It As It Lays – Alicia Bridges
 1979 Where I Should Be – Peter Frampton
 1979 Never Been Here Before – Paulette McWilliams
 1979 Dreams of Tomorrow – Marilyn Scott
 1979 Remote Control – The Tubes

1980s

 1980 Bebe le Strange – Heart
 1980 Greatest Hits: Live – Heart
 1980 La Toya Jackson – La Toya Jackson
 1980 The Hawkins Family (Live) – Walter Hawkins
 1980 Heaven Above Me – Frankie Valli
 1980 No Night So Long – Dionne Warwick
 1981 The Boys Are Back – Stone City Band
 1981 But What Will the Neighbors Think – Rodney Crowell
 1981 Coconuts High – Izumi Kobayashi
 1981 Direct - Tower of Power
 1981 Heart – Heart
 1981 Take It Off – Chic
 1982 Flat–Picking Spectacular – Joe Maphis
 1982 Steve Forbert – Steve Forbert
 1982 Picture This – Huey Lewis and the News
 1983 Lee Palmer – Lee Palmer
 1984 Civilized Man – Joe Cocker
 1984 Like a Virgin – Madonna
 1984 Tonight – David Bowie
 1984 The Gospel at Colonus soundtrack – Bob Telson, Donald Fagen
 1984 Leader of the Pack soundtrack – Various
 1984 Surrender – Robin Clark
 1985 Step By Step – Jeff Lorber
 1985 Live at the Apollo with David Ruffin, Eddie Kendricks, Hall & Oates
 1985 Middle of the Night – Taka Boom
 1985 Riptide – Robert Palmer
 1985 She's the Boss – Mick Jagger
 1985 The Heat – Nona Hendryx
 1985 Bump the Renaissance – Bobby Previte
 1985 Confrontation – Face to Face
 1985 Listen Now Do You – Sheena Easton
 1985 Little Creatures – Talking Heads
 1985 Mask of Smiles – John Waite
 1985 Power Station 33 1/3 – The Power Station
 1985 Power Station – The Power Station
 1985 When the Boys Meet the Girls – Sister Sledge
 1985 Dancing in the Street – Mick Jagger & David Bowie
 1986 3 Hearts in the Happy Ending Machine – Daryl Hall
 1986 At Least We Got Shoes – Southside Johnny & the Asbury Jukes
 1986 Brutal Dub – Black Uhuru
 1986 Brutal – Black Uhuru
 1986 Heartbeat – Don Johnson
 1986 Home in the Heart of the Beat – Beat Rodeo
 1986 Innocent – Peter Gordon
 1986 Inside Story – Grace Jones
 1986 John Somebody – Scott Johnson
 1986 Press to Play – Paul McCartney
 1986 Secret Dreams & Forbidden Fire – Bonnie Tyler
 1987 Brooklyn – Peter Gordon
 1987 Belouis Some – Belouis Some
 1987 Conjure: Cab Calloway Stands in for the Moon – Kip Hanrahan
 1987 Hunger– Michael Bolton
 1987 Is There Rockin' in This House – Terri Gonzalez
 1987 Lenny Pickett with the Borneo Horns – Lenny Pickett
 1987 Never Let Me Down – David Bowie
 1987 Never Never Land – Simon F.
 1987 Strange Weather – Marianne Faithfull
 1987 Dominion/Mother Russia – The Sisters Of Mercy
 1988 Remote – Hue and Cry
 1988 Constant Fear – Paranoise
 1988 Direct – Tower of Power
 1988 Distant Drums – Brian Slawson
 1988 Doble Vida – Soda Stereo
 1988 Groovin ' – The Missing Links
 1988 Molly on the Shore – Richard Greene
 1988 Naked – Talking Heads
 1988 Never Felt So Good – James Ingram
 1988 Ooh Yeah! – Hall & Oates
 1988 Out of Order – Rod Stewart
 1988 Shag – Original Soundtrack
 1988 Tear Down These Walls – Billy Ocean
 1989 The Lion for Real – Allen Ginsberg
 1989 Addictions, Vol. 1 – Robert Palmer
 1989 Charlie Sexton – Charlie Sexton
 1989 Conscious Party – Ziggy Marley & the Melody Makers
 1989 D'Atra Hicks – D'atra Hicks
 1989 Gutterboy – Gutterboy
 1989 Languis – Soda Stereo
 1989 Mick Jones – Mick Jones
 1989 One Bright Day – Ziggy Marley & the Melody Makers
 1989 One Night of Sin – Joe Cocker
 1989 Signs of Life – Charlie Elgart
 1989 Stay Awake – Hal Willner
 1989 Storm Front – Billy Joel
 1989 Strange Angels – Laurie Anderson
 1989 Whirlwind – Danny Gottlieb

1990s

 1990 Changesbowie – David Bowie
 1990 Dead City Radio – William S. Burroughs
 1990 In Your Eyes – James D-Train Williams
 1990 Leningrad–Xpress – Peter Gordon
 1990 Passages – Ravi Shankar and Philip Glass
 1990 A Place Like This – Robbie Nevil
 1990 Song of the Sun – Jim Beard
 1990 To Be Continued... – Elton John
 1990 Tonight [Bonus Tracks] – David Bowie
 1991 Another Hand – David Sanborn
 1991 Sereno – Wilkins
 1991 Signature – Charlie Musselwhite
 1992 Road to Freedom – Grayson Hugh
 1992 A Dove – The Roches
 1992 Ese Soy Yo – Emmanuel
 1992 Flowers and Stones – Peter, Paul and Mary
 1992 Get a Little – G.E. Smith & Saturday Night Live Band
 1992 Gutterboy – Gutterboy
 1992 MTV Unplugged [EP] – Mariah Carey
 1992 MTV Unplugged [MTV Unplugged + 3] – Mariah Carey
 1992 Sun Sun – Casiopea Sax (Tenor)
 1992 Upfront – David Sanborn
 1993 Arc – Jimmy Haslip
 1993 Bat Out of Hell II: Back into Hell – Meat Loaf
 1993 I'm No Angel – Carole Davis
 1993 Love Scenes – Beverley Craven
 1993 Over My Heart – Laura Branigan
 1993 Press to Play [Bonus Tracks] – Paul McCartney
 1993 Ships at Sea, Sailors and Shoes – Ned Sublette
 1993 Short Cuts – Original Soundtrack
 1993 Sons of Soul – Tony! Toni! Tone!
 1993 Start a New Race – Paranoise
 1993 T.O.P. – Tower of Power
 1994 Hearsay – David Sanborn
 1994 Jewels – Chieli Minucci
 1994 Merry Christmas – Mariah Carey
 1994 One Day Closer – Jonathan Edwards
 1994 Whistling in the Wind – Leon Redbone
 1995 Cab Calloway Stands in for the Moon – Conjure
 1995 Caribou [Bonus Tracks]– Elton John
 1995 Chroniques Bluesymentales – Hubert-Felix Thiefaine
 1995 Cool and Steady and Easy – Brooklyn Funk Essentials
 1995 Greetings from the Gutter – Dave Stewart
 1995 My Temptation – Vivian Williams
 1995 Real Time – Richard Tee
 1995 Spanner in the Works – Rod Stewart
 1996 Bicycle – Livingston Taylor
 1996 Concert for the Rock and Roll Hall of Fame
 1996 Havana Calling – Orlando "Maraca" Valle Y Otra Vision
 1996 Live: The Real Deal – Buddy Guy
 1996 Living in Fear – The Power Station
 1996 No Talking Just Head – The Heads
 1996 Strings Attached – Peter Ecklund
 1997 Direct Plus – Tower of Power
 1997 Excess Baggage – Original Soundtrack
 1997 Monsters from the Deep – Ned Sublette & Lawrence Weiner
 1998 Kiss My Blues – Tony Z
 1998 Read 'em & Weep – Clyde Roberts
 1998 Secret Handshake – Geoff Muldaur
 1998 Vincent Laguardia Gambini Sings Just for You – Joe Pesci
 1999 Al Confini: Interzone – Various Artists
 1999 Inside – David Sanborn
 1999 Live on Breeze Hill – Rick Danko Band
 1999 She's Lightning When She Smiles – Dave Soldier
 1999 Sip the Wine – Rick Danko Band
 1999 Social Studies – Loudon Wainwright III

2000s

 2000 Dinosaur Tracks – Tower of Power
 2000 Kick It up a Step! – Strokeland Superband
 2000 Long Expectant Comes at Last – Cathal McConnell
 2000 Man in a Jupiter Hat – Lee Feldman
 2000 Over the Edge – Professor Louie & Crowmatix
 2000 Pasajes De Un Sueno – Ana Torroja
 2000 Sound Loaded – Ricky Martin
 2000 Sweet on You – Chieli Minucci
 2002 Heathen – David Bowie
 2002 Slow Burn – David Bowie
 2003 Oakland Zone – Tower of Power
 2003 Universo Fortis – Alberto Fortis
 2004 Our Kind of Soul – Daryl Hall & John Oates
 2004 Wichita Vortex Sutra – Allen Ginsberg
 2005 Here Comes Tomorrow – Ursula 1000
 2006 Can't Quit the Blues – Buddy Guy
 2006 Planet Earth – Dennis Chambers
 2007 Holly Cole – Holly Cole
 2008 Cadillac Records – Original Soundtrack
 2008 It Is Time for a Love Revolution – Lenny Kravitz
 2008 Easy Come Easy Go – Marianne Faithfull
 2009 Organ Soul Sessions – Lucky Peterson
 2009 Bible Belt – Diane Birch

2010s
 2010 Love of Life Orchestra – Peter Laurence Gordon
 2010 Many Mamas, Many Papas – John Phillips
 2010 Teenage Dream – Katy Perry
 2010 30 Rock – Jeff Richmond
 2012 Love This Giant – David Byrne & St. Vincent
 2013 My True Story – Aaron Neville
 2013 Prism – Katy Perry
 2013 Son of Rogues Gallery: Pirate Ballads, Sea Songs & Chanteys
 2014 El Concierto de la Historia - Frágil 
 2016 I Can Do All Things – Jeremy Warren

References

External links
Lenny Pickett discography on Discogs
Lenny Pickett discography on AllMusic
Lenny Pickett page from New York University site
 Article about Lenny Pickett by Mike Zwerin (New York Times)

1954 births
20th-century American composers
20th-century American saxophonists
21st-century American composers
21st-century American saxophonists
American male composers
American rock saxophonists
American male saxophonists
Bessie Award winners
Living people
Musicians from New Mexico
New York University faculty
People from Las Cruces, New Mexico
Saturday Night Live Band members
Tower of Power members
20th-century American male musicians
21st-century American male musicians